The Heathside Cottage in the Fineview neighborhood of Pittsburgh, Pennsylvania is a Gothic Revival structure built between 1864 and 1866 for the family of stonemason and civil engineer James Andrews. It was listed on the National Register of Historic Places in 1974.

References

External links

Houses on the National Register of Historic Places in Pennsylvania
Houses in Pittsburgh
Victorian architecture in Pennsylvania
Gothic Revival architecture in Pennsylvania
Houses completed in 1855
Pittsburgh History & Landmarks Foundation Historic Landmarks
Historic American Buildings Survey in Pennsylvania
National Register of Historic Places in Pittsburgh
City of Pittsburgh historic designations